Colias dimera, the Dimera sulphur, is a butterfly in the family Pieridae. It is found in the Tropical Andes subregion of the Neotropical realm (Venezuela, Colombia, Peru, and Ecuador). The species was first discovered in Colombia. It is the most abundant butterfly in the interior of Ecuador.

There are two female forms: one is similar to the males, while the other is yellowish/greenish white.

References

External links 
 
 
 Butterflies of America images of types

dimera
Butterflies described in 1847
Pieridae of South America